George Passmore may refer to:

 George Passmore (artist) (born 1942), English artist, one half of the duo Gilbert & George
 George Passmore (cricketer) (1852–1935), English cricketer
 George Passmore (lacrosse) (1889–1952), American lacrosse player

de:George Passmore